The 2001–02 Moldovan "A" Division season is the 11th since its establishment. A total of 16 teams are contesting the league.

League table

References
 Moldova. Second Level 2001/02 - RSSSF

External links
 "A" Division - moldova.sports.md

Moldovan Liga 1 seasons
2
Moldova